Javier Sabriá Pitarch (born 14 July 1964) is a Spanish rowing coxswain. He competed in the men's coxed four event at the 1980 Summer Olympics.

References

1964 births
Living people
Spanish male rowers
Olympic rowers of Spain
Rowers at the 1980 Summer Olympics
Rowers from Barcelona
Coxswains (rowing)